Myriam Muller (born 12 April 1971) is a Luxembourger actress. She starred in Hochzäitsnuecht, which was screened in the Un Certain Regard section at the 1992 Cannes Film Festival.

Selected filmography
 Hochzaeitsnuecht (1992)
 Marie de Nazareth (1995)
 8½ Women (1999)
 Shadow of the Vampire (2000)
 The Murder of Princess Diana (2007)
 Don't Look Back (2009)

References

External links

1971 births
Living people
Luxembourgian film actresses
20th-century Luxembourgian actresses
21st-century Luxembourgian actresses